The discography of Shawn Colvin, an American singer-songwriter and musician, consists of eight studio albums, two live albums and sixteen singles.

Studio albums

Live albums

Compilation albums

Singles

Other contributions
 Tom Russell – Heart On A Sleeve – Duet and background vocals on several tracks – Frontera – 1984
 Bruce Hornsby & The Range – A Night on the Town – Appearance on 4 tracks – "Barren Ground", "Stander on the Mountain", "Lost Soul, Special Night" – RCA – 1990
 It Could Happen to You Track 1: "Young at Heart" – Tony Bennett and Shawn Colvin – Sony – 1994
 Beat the Retreat: Songs by Richard Thompson – "A Heart Needs a Home" (with Loudon Wainwright III) (1995, Capitol)
 Curtis Stigers – Time Was Track 8: "Time Was" (Duet with Curtis Stigers) – Arista – 1995
 Till the Night Is Gone: Tribute to Doc Pomus – Track 3: "Viva Las Vegas" – Forward (2) – 1995
 One Fine Day Track 5: "Someone Like You" – Sony – 1996
 Grace of My Heart Track 5: "Between Two Worlds" – MCA Soundtracks – 1996
 Jimmy Webb – Ten Easy Pieces Track 7: "Didn't We" (Harmony Vocals) – Guardian Records – 1996
 Legacy: A Tribute to Fleetwood Mac's Rumours Track 7: "The Chain" – Atlantic Records – 1998
 Elmopalooza! Track 6: "I Don't Want to Live on the Moon" (with Ernie) – Sony Wonder – 1998
 Armageddon Track 6: "When the Rainbow Comes" – 1998
 Runaway Bride Track 8: "Never Saw Blue Like That" – Sony – 1999
 Bela Fleck and the Flecktones – Outbound Track 3: "A Moment So Close" (Vocals) – 2000
 Chris Botti – Night Sessions Track 5: "All Would Envy" (Lead Vocals) – Columbia – 2001
 The Little Bear Movie – "Great Big World", "Everybody Wants to Paint My Picture" – 2001
 Serendipity Track 7: "When You Know" – Sony – 2001
 Stuart Little 2 – Music From And Inspired By Stuart Little 2 Track 7: "Hold On To The Good Things" – Sony – 2002
 107.1 KGSR Radio Austin – Broadcasts, Vol.10 Track 7: "Not a Drop of Rain" – 2002
 WYEP Live and Direct: Volume 4 – On Air Performances Track 3: "Whole New You" – 2002
Because of Winn-Dixie Track 9: “Fly” – Nettwerk – 2005
 Born to the Breed: A Tribute to Judy Collins Track 1: "Secret Gardens" – Wildflower Records – 2008
 This One's for Him: A Tribute to Guy Clark Volume 1, Track 3: "All He Wants Is You" – Icehouse Music – 2011
 Buddy Miller – Buddy Miller's Majestic Silver Strings Track 8: "That's the Way Love Goes" – New West Records – 2011
 Judy Collins – Bohemian Track 2: "Cactus Tree" (with Judy Collins) – Wildflower Records Under Exclusive License to Cleopatra Records, Inc. – 2011
 Looking Into You: A Tribute to Jackson Browne Track 20: "Call It a Loan" – Music Road Records – 2014
 Billy Childs – Map to the Treasure: Reimagining Laura Nyro Track 8: "Save the Country" (with Chris Botti) – Sony Masterworks – 2014
 Buddy Miller & Friends – Cayamo Sessions at Sea Track 8: "Wild Horses" – New West Records – 2016

References

Colvin, Shawn
Folk music discographies